Essing is a municipality in the district of Kelheim in Bavaria in Germany. It lies on the river Altmühl.

References

Kelheim (district)